This is the list of Belgian Senators from 1999 till 2003.

Election results (13 May 1999)

Seat division

By type

Senators by Right

Directly elected senators

Dutch-speaking electorate (25)

French-speaking electorate (15)

Community senators

Flemish Community (10)

French-speaking Community (10)

German-speaking Community (1)

Coopted senators

Dutch language group (6)

French language group (4)

By party

Dutch-speaking

Flemish Liberals and Democrats (11)

Christian People's Party (10)

Flemish Block (6)

Socialist Party (6)

Agalev (5)

VU (3)

French-speaking

Liberal Reformist Party/Democratic Front of the Francophones (9)

Socialist Party (9)

Ecolo (6)

Christian Social Party (5)

References

1999 in Belgium
2000s in Belgium